BIFAN may refer to: 
 Bucheon International Fantastic Film Festival, genre film festival in South Korea
 Bulletin de l'Institut Fondamental d'Afrique Noire